Romario Steffen Rösch (born 1 July 1999) is a German footballer who plays as a midfielder for SSV Ulm.

Career
Rösch made his professional debut for Roda JC Kerkrade in the Eerste Divisie on 23 August 2019, coming on as a substitute in the 66th minute for Juan Alonso against NEC, with the home match finishing as a 1–2 loss.

On 27 June 2022, Rösch returned to SSV Ulm.

References

External links
 
 
 
 

1999 births
Living people
Sportspeople from Ulm
Footballers from Baden-Württemberg
German footballers
Germany youth international footballers
German expatriate footballers
German expatriate sportspeople in the Netherlands
Expatriate footballers in the Netherlands
Association football midfielders
FC Augsburg II players
Roda JC Kerkrade players
Regionalliga players
Eerste Divisie players
1. FSV Mainz 05 II players
1. FSV Mainz 05 players
SSV Ulm 1846 players
Bundesliga players